John Karelse (born 17 May 1970 in Wemeldinge) is a retired Dutch football goalkeeper and unemployed manager after being fired by NAC Breda.

He played for AGOVV Apeldoorn in his native country for a few years before moving to NAC Breda. It was here that he caught the attention of then Newcastle United manager Ruud Gullit, who signed him for an undisclosed fee (thought to be in the region of £800,000) in August 1999. His time at Newcastle was largely unsuccessful, as he endured a terrible start to his career at the club, losing 4-2 to Southampton on his debut. He found his first team opportunities very limited after this, not helped by the competition for his position being very high with the reliable Shay Given and Steve Harper also at the club. Tony Caig was also ahead of him as third choice backup. He did, however, manage to keep a clean sheet against Arsenal at Highbury, in what proved to be his third and final game for the club.

A proposed move to Turkey broke down in 2000, but a year later a move back to the Netherlands seemed likely, with Feyenoord rumoured to be interested. No move materialised and the former Dutch Under-21 international had no choice but to stay in the Newcastle reserves. He retired in 2004 after one final season at AGOVV Apeldoorn.

In 2006, he became interim manager of NAC and led the team successfully through the relegation play-offs. Karelse became manager of NAC in 2011.

References

Profile

1970 births
Living people
Dutch footballers
Expatriate footballers in England
Association football goalkeepers
Dutch expatriate footballers
Eredivisie players
NAC Breda players
AGOVV Apeldoorn players
Newcastle United F.C. players
Premier League players
NAC Breda managers
People from Kapelle
Dutch football managers
Footballers from Zeeland
Dutch expatriate sportspeople in England